Orzechówko may refer to:

Orzechówko, Kuyavian-Pomeranian Voivodeship (north-central Poland)
Orzechówko, Olecko County in Warmian-Masurian Voivodeship (north Poland)
Orzechówko, Olsztyn County in Warmian-Masurian Voivodeship (north Poland)